The 2018 Colombia Oro y Paz was a road cycling stage race that took place in Colombia between 6 and 11 February 2018. It was the first edition of the Colombia Oro y Paz, and was rated as a 2.1 event as part of the UCI America Tour.

Teams
Twenty-five teams started the race. Each team had a maximum of six riders:

Route

Stages

Stage 1

Stage 2

Stage 3

Stage 4

Stage 5

Stage 6

Final standings

References

External links

2018
2018 UCI America Tour
2018 in Colombian sport
February 2018 sports events in South America